Frederick John Silvester (born 20 September 1933) is a retired British Conservative Party politician.

Silvester contested the Walthamstow West parliamentary constituency in 1966; he was elected a Member of Parliament (MP) at the Walthamstow West by-election in 1967, but lost the seat at the 1970 general election. He was returned to Parliament at the February 1974 general election as MP for Manchester Withington, and held that seat but he was defeated at the 1987 general election by Labour's Keith Bradley.

Silvester is a major character in the play This House which depicts the 1974-79 UK Parliaments.

References

Sources
The Times Guide to the House of Commons, Times Newspapers Ltd, 1966 & 1987

External links 
 

1933 births
Living people
Conservative Party (UK) MPs for English constituencies
Councillors in Greater London
UK MPs 1966–1970
UK MPs 1974
UK MPs 1974–1979
UK MPs 1979–1983
UK MPs 1983–1987
Alumni of Sidney Sussex College, Cambridge
Conservative Party (UK) councillors